The Maserati Tipo 60/61 (commonly referred to as the Maserati Birdcage) are a series of sports racing cars produced between 1959 and 1961 by Italian automobile manufacturer Maserati for privateers racing in sports car events including the 24 Hours of Le Mans in the 2-litre and 3-litre racing category. It used an intricate tubular space frame chassis, containing about 200 chro-moly steel tubes welded together, arranged triangular formation at high stress areas of the chassis, hence the nickname "Birdcage". This method of construction provided a more rigid and, at the same time, lighter chassis than other racing cars of the time.

By recessing the windscreen base into the bodywork, Maserati was able to reduce the effect of new Le Mans rules demanding a tall windscreen.
The Camoradi team became famous racing the Tipo 61s but, despite being very competitive, the Birdcage was somewhat unreliable and retired from many races due to problems with the drivetrain.

The road legal version of the Maserati MC 12 was available in a white colour with blue stripes livery as a tribute to the Tipo 61 and the Camoradi racing team. 

The Tipo 60/61 were succeeded by the Tipo 151 which used a more conventional tubular chassis.

Development history 
In  1958, the Orsi family assigned technical director Giulio Alfieri to devise technical solutions to make Maserati race cars more competitive on the track, he was given freedom despite the company's difficult financial situation at the time. The initial idea was to use a backbone chassis, as used by Maserati's competitors but that idea did not go ahead. In October 1958, Alfieri and his team came up with an innovative idea which consisted of using 200 small steel tubes having a diameter between 10 to 15 mm welded together in very short lengths in a complex mesh to form a cage like structure.

A compact  four-cylinder engine taken from the 200S was mounted at the front of the car at a 45-degree angle and towards the centre for a better centre of gravity. The engine was significantly modified, having newly designed cylinder heads, a 93x72 mm bore and stroke, twin Weber 45 DCO3 carburettors, Marelli battery powered dual ignition and a revised exhaust system. The suspension systems consisted of spiral springs at the front and De Dion rear axle with single transverse leaf spring.

The first car was completed in May 1959 and was given to Stirling Moss for testing. Initial tests revealed cracks in the chassis. The development team would resolve the issue by changing the grade of the steel used to construct the chassis. On 12 July 1959, the Tipo 60 won in its debut race, driven by Moss. This caught the attention of American racing teams competing in the 3-litre class. Consequently, weight was increased to  due to the use of a revised propeller shaft in the engine. This change did not affect the fuel consumption which gave the car a significant advantage during races. The revised version of the car was called the Tipo 61.

Racing history 
The Tipo 60/61's impressive performance would catch the attention of "Lucky" Casner. After testing a prototype of the car at the Modena Autodrome, and on his request, a prototype of a Tipo 60 would be converted to a Tipo 61 and delivered to him fielded by Maserati. Initial races with Carroll Shelby driving the car would be troublesome but the car showed promising results at the 1960 Targa Florio driven by Umberto Maglioli but would retire due to an engine failure. Casner founded the Casner Motor Racing Division who raced three Tipo 61's in the 1960 24 Hours of Le Mans. Rain combined with the impractical windshield design would once again not let the car finish. The Tipos never won Le Mans due to reliability issues, however in both 1960 and 1961 the Camoradi team won the 1000 km Nürburgring.

The Birdcage series 

The Tipo 61 was the most well known model but Giulio Alfieri designed 5 different models, all based on an intricate multi-tubular frame concept. This multi-tubular construction produced a light weight and rigid chassis that was a significant competitive advantage for a racing car. All models included independent front suspension, 4-wheel disc brakes and 5-speed transmission. A De Dion type rear axle was used on the Tipo 60 and 61.

The mid-engined Birdcage cars began with the Tipo 63. Maserati now changed to a mid-engine configuration using a similar multi-tubular chassis construction as the Tipo 60/61. The rear suspension was changed to an independent double wishbone configuration.

The Tipo 63 through 65 cars have been described as a "historian's nightmare". Maserati was in difficult financial circumstances and Giulio Alfieri was trying to build a competitive car on a low budget. He would retrieve various engines from the Maserati parts bins. Then, he had them modified and installed in the ten various chassis that were constructed from the ground up. The Tipo 63 was raced with four-cylinder and twelve-cylinder engines and the chassis was radically redesigned when the first version proved less competitive than the Tipo 61.

The Tipo 63 first used a 4-cylinder engine similar to the Tipo 61 and later a V12 engine from the 1957 250F Grand Prix car. The Tipo 63 cars raced in 1961 with both engines, placing 4th at the 24 hours of Le Mans (12 cylinder version) with Briggs Cunningham's team. Count Volpi’s Scuderia Serenissima hired Medardo Fantuzzi to modify one of their Tipo 63 cars with a longer nose and a fin behind the driver.The Tipo 64 featured the same 3-liter V12 as the Tipo 63 with an upgraded frame (many smaller light alloy tubes) - nicknamed "Supercage".

Only one car was built using a modified Tipo 63 chassis.

Maserati Birdcage 75th (2005 concept car) 

The Maserati Birdcage 75th is a concept car to honor both the Birdcage and the 75th anniversary of Pininfarina. It features a  V12 engine.

References

External links 

The Marvelous Tipo 61 Racing Car
 1960 Maserati Birdcage Tipo 61 Restoration and FIA Documents
 Birdcage #2469 1960 Riverside Winner Photos
Birdcage Period Racing Photos
Tipo 63 - history from start to finish
The racing history of the Maserati Birdcage cars
 Maserati Birdcage Tipo 61 2459

Tipo 61 'Birdcage'
Sports racing cars
24 Hours of Le Mans race cars